Little Bow was a provincial electoral district in Alberta, Canada, mandated to return a single member to the Legislative Assembly of Alberta from 1913 to 2019.

Throughout its history, this district has been dominated by agricultural activities. Because the area is prone to summer time drought and frequent water rationing, agriculture has been limited to grain crops and cattle ranches. The 2003 BSE crisis, and the subsequent closure of the US border to Canadian cattle, became a major election issue.

The district's major communities, Vulcan, Coalhurst, the Siksika Nation, Arrowwood, Picture Butte and Mossleigh provide service centres for area's agricultural and oil & gas industries.

History
The electoral district was created in the 1913 boundary redistribution from four different districts. It was primarily carved out of Lethbridge District and also took land from the eastern portion of High River, Claresholm and Nanton.

The 2010 electoral boundary re-distribution saw the electoral district change only slightly as a portion of land was moved into the district from Highwood.

The Little Bow electoral district was dissolved in the 2017 electoral boundary re-distribution, and portions of the district would form the Cardston-Siksika and Taber-Warner electoral districts.

Boundary history

Representation history

The electoral district was created in 1913 in the controversial and scandal ridden redistricting that year. It was created from four different ridings which had a mixture of representation primarily Liberals as well as Independents and a Conservative.

Through the first 100 years in the history of this district, it was only represented by five members of the Legislative Assembly. Historically, voters in this riding tended to favour the candidate more than the party, as shown by Member of the Legislative Assembly (MLA) Raymond Speaker's lengthy term in office.

The first representative elected in 1913 was Liberal candidate James McNaughton. He won re-election with a landslide majority in 1917. McNaughton would be defeated running for his third term in office by United Farmers of Alberta candidate Oran McPherson.

McPherson became Speaker of the Legislature in 1922. He was re-elected to his second term in 1926 defeating McNaughton for the last time and acclaimed to his third term in 1930. Near the end of his third term McPherson went through a scandal-ridden divorce that made front-page headlines. He lost favour with his constituents at a time when the United Farmers lost popularity due to the great depression and the John Edward Brownlee sex scandal.

Little Bow would change representatives in 1935. The electors went along with most of the province in returning a Social Credit candidate. Peter Dawson would easily defeat McPherson with a landslide majority as his party formed government. Dawson became the second speaker of the Assembly to represent the district in 1937.

Dawson would enjoy a long career in the Assembly easily winning re-election in 1940, 1944, 1948, 1952, 1955 and 1959 without his popular support dropping below 50%. On March 24, 1963 McPherson would die from a heart attack. Little Bow would be left vacant until the 1963 general election held a few months later.

The 1963 election saw Social Credit candidate Raymond Speaker win his first election easily with 64% of the popular vote. He would be re-elected to his second term with a landslide in 1967. After the election Premier Ernest Manning appointed Speaker to the provincial cabinet as a Minister without Portfolio. When Premier Harry Strom came to power in 1968, Speaker remained in cabinet, this time becoming Minister of Social Development.

Speaker would win his third term in office in the 1971 election with a large majority. He would lose his cabinet post as his party was swept out of government. He would win re-election as a Social Credit MLA with large majorities in 1975 and 1979 despite the near total collapse of his party.

On October 5, 1982, Speaker, who was acting as parliamentary leader of the Social Credit caucus, had issues with Party leader Rod Sykes. After a motion to disband the moribund party failed, Speaker and Walt Buck resigned from Social Credit to run as independents in the 1982 election.  He retained his seat with just over 50% of the popular vote.

After the 1982 election, Speaker and Buck tried to form the official opposition instead of the two man NDP caucus. The legislature denied them funding and they didn't get the same budget that the NDP had because they weren't a party. In 1984 they registered the Political Alternative Association with Elections Alberta, which they quickly renamed the Representative Party of Alberta. Speaker became leader of the party and led it into the 1986 election.

The Representative Party would hold its two seats with Speaker winning his seventh term in office. He would abandon the Representative Party to cross the floor to the Progressive Conservative caucus in 1987. Speaker ran for re-election as a Progressive Conservative candidate in 1989 and won his eighth term. He was re-appointed to cabinet by Premier Don Getty as Minister of Municipal Affairs after an 18-year absence.

Speaker vacated his seat in 1992 after being nominated by the Reform Party of Canada to run for a seat to the House of Commons of Canada. After Speaker left, a contentious and divided by-election took place. Progressive Conservative candidate Barry McFarland barely retained this seat for the party. The Liberals came very close to taking back Little Bow, with its best result in 70 years.

McFarland was re-elected five times without serious difficulty. He retired in 2012, and Wildrose candidate Ian Donovan took the seat.  Donovan crossed the floor to the Tories in 2014.  He was narrowly defeated in his bid for a second term by his replacement as Wildrose candidate, Dave Schneider.  It was the first time in the riding's history that its member had not been returned for a second term.  Because of the Electoral Boundary changes as of the 2019 election, Schneider became the last Member of the Legislative Assembly to represent the Little Bow riding.

Legislature results

1913 general election

1917 general election

1921 general election

1926 general election

1930 general election

1935 general election

1940 general election

1944 general election

1948 general election

1952 general election

1955 general election

1959 general election

1963 general election

1967 general election

1971 general election

1975 general election

1979 general election

1982 general election

1986 general election

1989 general election

1992 by-election

1993 general election

1997 general election

2001 general election

2004 general election

2008 general election

2012 general election

2015 general election

Senate nominee results

2004 Senate nominee election district results
Voters had the option of selecting 4 Candidates on the Ballot

2012 Senate nominee election district results

Student Vote results

2004 election

On November 19, 2004 a Student Vote was conducted at participating Alberta schools to parallel the 2004 Alberta general election results. The vote was designed to educate students and simulate the electoral process for persons who have not yet reached the legal majority. The vote was conducted in 80 of the 83 provincial electoral districts with students voting for actual election candidates. Schools with a large student body that reside in another electoral district had the option to vote for candidates outside of the electoral district then where they were physically located.

2012 election

Plebiscite results

1948 Electrification Plebiscite
District results from the first province wide plebiscite on electricity regulation.

1957 liquor plebiscite

On October 30, 1957 a stand-alone plebiscite was held province wide in all 50 of the then current provincial electoral districts in Alberta. The government decided to consult Alberta voters to decide on liquor sales and mixed drinking after a divisive debate in the Legislature. The plebiscite was intended to deal with the growing demand for reforming antiquated liquor control laws.

The plebiscite was conducted in two parts. Question A asked in all districts, asked the voters if the sale of liquor should be expanded in Alberta, while Question B asked in a handful of districts within the corporate limits of Calgary and Edmonton asked if men and woman were allowed to drink together in establishments.

Province wide Question A of the plebiscite passed in 33 of the 50 districts while Question B passed in all five districts. Little Bow just barely voted in favour of the proposal with both sides polling a strong vote. Voter turnout in the district was one of the best in the province, significantly above the province wide average of 46%.

Official district returns were released to the public on December 31, 1957. The Social Credit government in power at the time did not considered the results binding. However the results of the vote led the government to repeal all existing liquor legislation and introduce an entirely new Liquor Act.

Municipal districts lying inside electoral districts that voted against the Plebiscite were designated Local Option Zones by the Alberta Liquor Control Board and considered effective dry zones, business owners that wanted a license had to petition for a binding municipal plebiscite in order to be granted a license.

1967 Daylight Saving Plebiscite
District data from the 1967 Daylight Saving Plebiscite

1971 Daylight Saving Plebiscite
District data from the 1971 Daylight Saving Plebiscite

See also
List of Alberta provincial electoral districts

References

Further reading

External links
Elections Alberta
The Legislative Assembly of Alberta

Former provincial electoral districts of Alberta